William Daniel Berg (born October 21, 1967) is a Canadian former professional ice hockey winger who played in the National Hockey League (NHL) for four teams between 1988 and 1999.

Early life
Berg was born in St. Catharines, Ontario. Playing on both wing and defense, Berg had a minor league apprenticeship with the Springfield Indians of the American Hockey League, with whom he won a Calder Cup in 1990.

Career 
Berg started his National Hockey League career with the New York Islanders in 1988–89. He also played for the Toronto Maple Leafs, New York Rangers, and Ottawa Senators. He retired after the 1998–99 campaign. In 2008, Berg began coaching high school hockey at Ridley College.

Berg served as a hockey analyst on the NHL Network's NHL on the Fly and On the Fly: Final. He previously appeared on the radio program Hockey Central at Noon on CJCL, which was also simulcast on Rogers Sportsnet.

Career statistics

Regular season and playoffs

Awards and honors

References

External links
 

1967 births
Living people
Canadian ice hockey defencemen
Canadian ice hockey forwards
Canadian radio sportscasters
Canadian television sportscasters
Capital District Islanders players
Hartford Wolf Pack players
Ice hockey people from Ontario
New York Islanders draft picks
New York Islanders players
New York Rangers players
Peoria Rivermen (IHL) players
Ottawa Senators players
Sportspeople from St. Catharines
Springfield Indians players
Toronto Maple Leafs players
Toronto Marlboros players